The  ENC E-Z Rider and its successor E-Z Rider II are a line of low-floor, mid-sized transit buses available in 30', 32', and 35' nominal lengths manufactured by ENC (formerly ElDorado National–California) in Riverside, California starting from 1996. In addition to the different lengths, the buses are available with several powertrain options including traditional diesel, CNG, LNG, Propane, and diesel-electric hybrid.

The initial E-Z Rider was offered from 1996 to 2001. ENC marketed its successor, the E-Z Rider II, from 2001 to 2007. From 2005 until 2014 ENC also offered a restyled model as the E-Z Rider II MAX. The most recent and currently sold version is the E-Z Rider II BRT with bus rapid transit styling and features, which was introduced in 2008.

Design
ElDorado National filed an application in 1994 to trademark the name E-Z Rider, and the cited date of first use is June 1996. It was the first low-floor bus from ElDorado, and is deployed typically as a shuttle bus for universities, airport hotels, small transit fleets, and car rental services, but also has been used as a heavy-duty transit bus, as it was designed to the required 12 year/500,000-mile STURAA life. Like most low-floor buses offered in North America, the E-Z Rider and E-Z Rider II have a partial low-floor layout, where the seating area from the rear axle to the back of the bus is on an elevated platform to provide space for the engine and transmission.

Updates
Several different floorplans were offered to accommodate 20 to 29 seated passengers.

The E-Z Rider II is offered in three different lengths (30', 32', 35' nominal). The front and rear overhangs of the BRT measure , respectively.

Initial versions of the E-Z Rider II were styled similarly to the E-Z Rider, with quad sealed beam headlights. Later, the E-Z Rider II was restyled with small round projector headlights; the MAX can be distinguished by the slight upward tilt (at the outer corners) of its headlight array compared to the original II. The BRT uses a front end and windshield that is canted backwards for streamlining.

Hybrid

In the late 1990s, LADOT contracted with ISE Corporation to build eight prototype ThunderVolt series hybrid buses by installing an electric traction motor driven by an auxiliary power unit (APU) and storage battery into E-Z Rider buses. Four of these buses were to be equipped with propane-fueled 30 kW Capstone Turbine APUs and four would use propane-fueled internal combustion engine APUs built by GM. Regardless of the APU type, the electric drivetrain remained the same, a Siemens traction motor and lead-acid battery.

The E-Z Rider II also was sold with the ISE ThunderVolt hybrid-electric propulsion, including at least four buses (to Big Blue Bus serving Santa Monica, California) with gasoline-fueled APUs and similar electric traction equipment. Big Blue Bus had originally planned to acquire ten hybrid buses. Over time, the ISE ThunderVolt systems proved to be unreliable and many buses equipped with the system were either retired or repowered.

In more recent years, ENC has started offering the Allison Transmission H 40 hybrid system, which has been proven much more reliable in applications with transit agencies across the nation. The H 40 hybrid system is coupled to the engine in lieu of a conventional transmission and offers continuously variable gear ratios with integrated assistance from a 600 V(AC) electric traction motor that is capable of driving the bus on electricity alone if needed; separate regenerative braking, power conversion, and energy storage modules are included. In 2021, the San Francisco Municipal Railway ordered 30 E-Z Rider II BRT coaches equipped with the H 40 hybrid system.

Fuel cell

ThunderPower, LLC, a joint venture of Thor Industries (the parent of ElDorado National at the time) and ISE Corporation (a hybrid drivetrain integrator), designed and built the ThunderPower TB30-FCH fuel cell prototype bus. The TB30-FCH was built on a 30' E-Z Rider II chassis, and equipped with a UTC Power hydrogen fuel cell and the ISE ThunderVolt series hybrid powertrain. The ThunderPower prototype was tested by SunLine Transit Agency in 2002, including three months of revenue service. It was subsequently tested at Chula Vista Transit and AC Transit.

After the test, the larger ENC Axess was selected as the chassis for further development and commercialization of fuel cell buses as part of the American Fuel Cell Bus (AFCB) program.

Competition
 Gillig Low Floor - Low-floor bus offered in mid-sized lengths
 NABI LFW - Discontinued (1997–2015) low-floor bus offered in mid-sized lengths
 Neoplan Transliner - Discontinued (1981–2006) high-floor and low-floor bus offered in mid-sized lengths
 New Flyer Low Floor - Discontinued (1991–2014) low-floor bus offered in mid-sized lengths
 New Flyer Xcelsior - Low-floor bus offered in mid-sized lengths
 Orion VII - Discontinued (2001–2013) low-floor bus offered in mid-sized lengths

References

External links

 

Buses of the United States
Vehicles introduced in 1996